The 2015–16 Idaho Vandals men's basketball team represented the University of Idaho during the 2015–16 NCAA Division I men's basketball season. The Vandals, led by eighth year head coach Don Verlin, played their home games at the Cowan Spectrum, with a few early season games at Memorial Gym, and were members of the Big Sky Conference. They finished the season 21–13, 12–6 record in Big Sky play to finish in third place. They defeated Eastern Washington in the quarterfinals of the Big Sky tournament to advance to the semifinals where they lost to Montana. They were invited to the College Basketball Invitational where they lost in the first round to Seattle.

Previous season
The Vandals finished the 2014–15 season 13–17, 8–10 in Big Sky play to finish in a tie for seventh place. They lost in the quarterfinals of the Big Sky tournament to Eastern Washington.

Departures

Incoming Transfers

2015 incoming recruits

Roster

Schedule

|-
!colspan=9 style="background:#B18E5F; color:#000000;"| Exhibition

|-
!colspan=9 style="background:#B18E5F; color:#000000;"| Non-conference regular season

|-
!colspan=9 style="background:#B18E5F; color:#000000;"| Big Sky regular season

|-
!colspan=9 style="background:#B18E5F; color:#000000;"| Big Sky tournament

|-
!colspan=9 style="background:#B18E5F; color:#000000;"| CBI

References

Idaho
Idaho Vandals men's basketball seasons
Idaho
Idaho
Idaho